Napięcie Theatre (Polish: Teatr Napięcie) is a non-institutional theatre established in 2005 in Łódź, Poland, by Łukasz Pięta. Napięcie creates mainly full-length plays allowing to find adjustable equivalent (in moves, words and scenic architecture) to reality influenced by dreams and brain/body weaknesses. Since 2007 they have worked on utilizing subliminal effects and signals on theatre scene. Since October 2008 NT have organized a series of theatrical actions and events (performances, plays etc.) called Dynamofaza Wittenberga (The Wittenberg's Dynamo-phase), an action which is aimed at creating the so-called ‘counter-theatre’ being a real alternative to unreal, contemporary alternative culture.

The authors of NT describe their theatre as ‘a synergetic theatre of imagination movements’. In their work they try to find a way to create a scenic event, play etc. which will differ from the work of contemporary alternative theatres. “In our plays we are trying to combine as many different ‘scenic channels’ as possible.” NT focus also on grotesque and tautological depictions of ideas.

The Napięcie Theatre work mainly with their own texts (“Salon Lenistwa”/”Showroom of Indolence” or “Lewa Strona, Prawa Strona”/”Left Side, Right Side”) but they also work with other author's pieces (“Przewodnik dla bezdomnych”/”A Short Guide for Homeless People” is based on Arthur Rimbaud's and Eugeniusz Tkaczyszyn-Dycki's works; their other plays are inspired by Plato and Andrzej Sosnowski).

The members of the theatre have not yet decided (and it is possible that they will never do it) on one, specific working method. That is an effect of conscious decision not to duplicate the same ideas in different plays. The only ‘rule’ of NT is to juggle with theatrical conventions (ex. mansion theatre or modernist cabaret).

Plays 
  
 Zawieszenie (2006) – Suspension
 Przewodnik dla bezdomnych (2007) – A Short Guide for Homeless People
 Salon lenistwa (2007) – Showroom of Indolence
 Pneuma (2007) – Pneuma
 Reżim Lalek (2007/2008) – Puppet Regime
 Lewa strona, prawa strona (2008) – Left Side, Right Side
 Uczta (2008) – Feast
 Opera Dożynki (2009 – work in progress) – Harvest Festival Opera
 Mitologiczny Cyrk doktora Papa-Geno (2010) – The Mythological Circus of Doctor Papa-Geno

Theatres in Łódź